Cololejeunea is a genus of liverworts in the family Lejeuneaceae.

References

External links 
 
 
 Cololejeunea at Tropicos

Porellales genera
Lejeuneaceae